Takeda Station is the name of multiple train stations in Japan.

Takeda Station (Hyōgo) - in Hyōgo Prefecture
Takeda Station (Kyoto) - in Kyoto Prefecture